Trichidema capense is a species of beetle in the family Carabidae, the only species in the genus Trichidema.

References

Lebiinae